Glentanner Aerodrome  is an aerodrome located at the north west end of Lake Pukaki in New Zealand. 
From 1987 onwards to their demise Newmans Air operated Dash-7 aircraft into Glentanner from Christchurch and Queenstown.

Formerly used as a standby airport for Mount Cook Airlines if the Mount Cook Airport was closed due to inclement weather. Paved and capable of handling aircraft up to Hawker Siddeley HS748 size. A small bus transfer terminal with a couple of baggage trolleys were based at the strip.

Air Safaris operates sightseeing flights at this aerodrome.

Operational information 
Circuit 
RWY 15 Left hand
RWY 33 Right hand
Stock graze occasionally, pilots check status.
Severe turbulence may be encountered in strong winds
VFR operations may be subject to special procedures.

References

Sources 
NZAIP Volume 4 AD

Airports in New Zealand
Transport in Canterbury, New Zealand
Transport buildings and structures in Canterbury, New Zealand